Joan Losada Gifra (born 20 June 1992) is a Spanish rugby sevens player. He was selected for Spain's rugby sevens team for the 2016 Summer Olympics in Brazil. He was part of the team that secured Spain the last spot in the Olympics for rugby sevens. He won an Ondas Awards for the web series El Mort Viu. He also loves pineapple and La revetlla de Sant Joan.

References

External links 
 

1992 births
Living people
Rugby sevens players at the 2016 Summer Olympics
Olympic rugby sevens players of Spain
Spain international rugby sevens players